

	

Wisanger is a locality in the Australian state  of South Australia located on the north coast of Kangaroo Island overlooking Investigator Strait to the north and the Bay of Shoals to the east about  south-west of the state capital of Adelaide and about  west of the municipal seat of Kingscote.

Its boundaries were created in March 2002 for the “long established name” which is reported as being given by a “Henry Partridge, who took up land there, after 'Wisanger Manor' near Stroud, Gloucestershire once owned by his forebears.”

The locality includes the former Wisanger School which is listed on the South Australian Heritage Register.

Wisanger is located within the federal division of Mayo, the state electoral district of Mawson and the local government area of the Kangaroo Island Council.

References
Notes

Citations

Towns on Kangaroo Island